Karayme Bartley (born 10 September 1995) is a Jamaican athlete. He competed in the mixed 4 × 400 metres relay event at the 2020 Summer Olympics.

Biography
In 2012, Bartley began his track career as a student at Garvey Maceo High School in Clarendon. The following year, he reached the final at the Inter-Secondary Schools Boys and Girls Championships in Jamaica. In 2015, Bartley earned a scholarship at Iowa Central Community College in the United States. After his graduation from Iowa Central, he attended the University of Iowa, graduating in 2019. In April 2021, Bartley ran a time of 20.42 seconds for the 200 metres, the fastest time by a Jamaican in the season.

After leaving the University of Iowa, Bartley joined the Texas Tech's Sports Performance Center at Texas Tech University. He finished in third place in the Jamaican trials for the 2020 Summer Olympics in the 400 metres, to qualify for the Olympics. Bartley had originally focused on the 200 metres, but an injury changed his focus to the 400 metres instead.

At the 2020 Summer Olympics, Bartley ran in both the men's 4 × 400 metres relay and the mixed 4 × 400 metres relay events.

References

External links
 

1995 births
Living people
Jamaican male sprinters
Athletes (track and field) at the 2020 Summer Olympics
Olympic athletes of Jamaica
People from Clarendon Parish, Jamaica
Texas Tech Red Raiders men's track and field athletes
World Athletics Championships medalists
20th-century Jamaican people
21st-century Jamaican people